Mara Provincial Park is a day-use provincial park in British Columbia, Canada, located on Mara Lake south of Sicamous.
The park is open with services from May 1 to September 27. The gate is locked open during the off season.

Mara Provincial Park is dedicated to intensive recreation, providing opportunities for public recreation
access and use of Mara Lake, with emphasis on swimming, picnicking and boat launching. Mara Provincial Park 
provides good sandy beaches and the only major public access and boat launch on Mara Lake.

There is fish-spawning at the mouths of two creeks. One kekuli pit can be found in the park, but
this feature is only considered as locally significant.

Images

See also
Shuswap Lake Marine Provincial Park (Mara Point Site)
List of protected areas of British Columbia

References

Provincial parks of British Columbia
Parks in the Shuswap Country
Provincial parks in the Okanagan
1958 establishments in British Columbia
Protected areas established in 1958
Articles containing video clips